Mystic Seaport Light is a lighthouse at the south end of Mystic Seaport,  upriver from Noank, Connecticut. The light is a two-story white shingled structured topped with a glass-enclosed lantern and is a replica of the 1901 Brant Point Light. The Mystic Seaport Light was designed by William F. Herman Jr. and constructed in 1966. It was formally dedicated on August 31, 1967, but remained unlit due to active navigational regulations imposed by the United States Coast Guard. The Mystic Seaport light is now an active light, but not an official aid to navigation.

The structure was used as an example of a lighthouse for Mystic Seaport visitors, but was not part of an exhibit until a 2008 renovation. The interior of the lighthouse was equipped with five LCD televisions to display two short educational films that highlight the history and architectural diversity of American lighthouses.

Design and construction
The Mystic Seaport Light was designed by William F. Herman Jr. and constructed by Engineered Building in 1966. Funds for the project were donated by Mr. and Mrs. John P. Blair. Mr. Blair was a member of the Board of Trustees of the Marine Historical Association since 1963. The Marine Historical Association was the original name for the Mystic Seaport. Prior to the construction of the light, a total of $5,000 was donated by Coast Guard Auxiliary members from Maine and Delaware to build the keeper's cottage.

The original artist's conception called for a generic lighthouse that was designed to be representative of all lighthouses, but the actual design of the lighthouse was later changed to a replica of the 1901 Brant Point Light located on Nantucket Island in Massachusetts. Constructed on the tip of Shipyard Point, it is a two-story white shingled structure topped with a glass-enclosed lantern. The lighthouse houses a fourth order Fresnel lens.

The design of the keeper's house did not change much from the original artist's conception, though Tim Harrison notes that "it does not resemble a typical lighthouse keeper's house." The dedication of the lighthouse was held on August 31, 1967, which was described as "another quiet[,] but proud ceremony" by Mystic Seaport. Care and maintenance of the lighthouse is performed by the Mystic Seaport.

Operational requirements 
The Mystic Seaport Light is subject to United States Coast Guard regulations to become operational, and because it is a full-sized replica of a lighthouse, requirements include supervisory schedules and installation of an emergency, backup light. This was not a financial priority for Mystic Seaport in 1967 and it was not made a fully functional lighthouse.

In 1979, Brierley noted that the present use of the lighthouse remained as "[a]n example of a lighthouse used as a navigational aid." Regardless of its intended function, the lighthouse was used as the starting mark for the Mystic River Day seine boat race in 1981. By 2014, it is active, using a fourth order Fresnel lens on loan from the Coast Guard, but is not an official aid to navigation.

Design renovation
In late 2007, the Mystic Seaport asked Oudens Ello Architecture of Boston to develop a design proposal for the light. Oudens Ello Architecture developed a "multilayered system of open wood slats and sound absorptive material creating an interior environment evocative of a Nantucket basket." The task called for an "audio-visual display in a single, conical room of little more than 100 square feet." The renovated exhibit was also made wheelchair accessible via a ramp.

Sentinels of the Sea
In July 2008, the Mystic Seaport Light became part of the visitor experience when the interior was opened as part of the "Sentinels of the Sea" exhibit. The exhibit displays two short educational films, The Heyday of Lighthouses and How to Look at a Lighthouse, on five LCD screens. The two films highlight the history and architectural diversity of American lighthouses.

See also

 List of lighthouses in Connecticut
 List of lighthouses in the United States

References

External links

Lighthouses completed in 1966
Lighthouses in New London County, Connecticut
Long Island Sound
Mystic, Connecticut